Natasha Liu Bordizzo (born 25 August 1994) is an Australian actress. She made her debut portraying the character of Snow Vase in Netflix's Crouching Tiger, Hidden Dragon: Sword of Destiny. In 2019, she portrayed the character of Helena in Netflix's The Society. In 2022, she portrayed the character of Heather in Netflix's Day Shift.

Early life and education 
Natasha Liu Bordizzo was born in Sydney. Her mother is Chinese and her father is of Italian descent. She attended Sydney Girls High School, then began studying a Bachelor of Law / Bachelor of Communication at University of Technology Sydney when she was cast in a leading role in Crouching Tiger, Hidden Dragon: Sword of Destiny despite it being her first ever audition. Bordizzo speculated she was cast due to her age and look, English fluency and martial arts ability, as she has a black-black belt in taekwondo and training in Kenpō karate.

Career 
To prepare for Crouching Tiger, Hidden Dragon: Sword of Destiny, Bordizzo underwent intensive training in Wudang sword fighting with Yuen Woo-ping.

In February 2016, upon the release of Crouching Tiger, Hidden Dragon: Sword of Destiny, Bordizzo moved to Los Angeles to pursue an international acting career.

In 2017, Bordizzo had the supporting role of Deng Yan in The Greatest Showman, an American musical film, directed by Michael Gracey in his directorial debut and starring Hugh Jackman, Zac Efron, Michelle Williams, Rebecca Ferguson, and Zendaya. Bordizzo was excited to begin principal photography in New York as she had never had any song or dance training—both of which she found terrifying. The film premiered on 8 December, aboard the RMS Queen Mary 2. It was released in the United States on 20 December, by 20th Century Fox and has grossed $432million worldwide, making it the fifth-highest grossing live-action musical of all time.

Bordizzo has also starred in Hotel Mumbai (2018), an American-Australian thriller film directed by Anthony Maras and written by John Collee and Maras. It is based on the 2009 documentary Surviving Mumbai about the Mumbai attacks in 2008 at the Taj Mahal Palace Hotel in India. Bordizzo portrayed Australian back-packer Bree, opposite stars Dev Patel, Armie Hammer, Nazanin Boniadi and Anupam Kher.

In 2021, Bordizzo starred as Julia in the Amazon Prime Video movie The Voyeurs . The film was shot in Montreal, Canada in 2019 and tells the story of a couple who witnesses the sex life of their neighbours. Bordizzo originally auditioned for the role on a video call using an American accent but the director requested she keep her native Australian accent. In the same year, Bordizzo starred in the animated comedy movie Wish Dragon as the voice of Li Na Wang. Her character is a celebrity who inspires a young boy's journey to be reunited with her because they were once childhood friends. In November 2021, Bordizzo was cast as Sabine Wren in the Star Wars limited series Ahsoka.

Bordizzo is a Chanel ambassador and modelled for Australian brand Bonds.

Interviews 

 When interviewing for Ahsoka, Bordizzo had no idea what project she was playing for. In an interview, she reports being asked to film a self-tape of what happened to be a Top Gun scene and a made-up scene that coincedentally reminded her of Harrison Ford’s Han Solo. She says, “[in the audition scene], this lady was trying to pay my character to help her, and my friend and I were like, ‘It’s almost like a young Han Solo kind of feeling.’ So that was just complete chance, and I still think of his role often, energetically, as I’m doing [Ahsoka] now. It’s just such a great energy and very inspiring”
 Bordizzo discovered news about her Star Wars casting while on-set with Jamie Foxx, shooting Day Shift, Netflix’s most recent number-one movie worldwide. In a whirlwind of events, she said “it’s one of the strangest and most wonderful casting experiences of my life.”
 She attributes her role as a vampire-hunting vampire as useful preparation for Ahsoka’s stunt training. She says, “[Day Shift’s stunt training] helped a lot, especially with weapons training. Everything and anything helps,” Bordizzo explains. “Even if you’re a physical person and physically fit, the act of being in a choreographed and really intense fight is still something to get used to. There are things like not squinting when you’re about to be hit. There are just so many little things that are jarring unless you’re used to stunts, so it definitely helped.”
 Bordizzo’s stunt skills have been developed through earlier projects she was involved with like sword-fighting in “Crouching Tiger, Hidden Dragon: Sword of Destiny.” She jokes “the sword has followed me through this career” as she explored different styles where “Crouching Tiger was very wuxia Chinese style, and Day Shift was much more samurai Katana style”. She enjoys exploring different styles, citing that “it’s an advantage [when joining new fighting films], but it’s also difficult because I have to unlearn so many things.”
 Bordizzo identifies with her new Ahsoka character as she mentions similarities, like sharing “her unbelievable bravery, spirit and swag, amidst all the challenge and heartache of everything going on” and how she uses her passion for the franchise to push her through acting challenges.

Filmography

Film

Television

References

External links 

1994 births
21st-century Australian actresses
Actresses from Sydney
Australian actresses of Chinese descent
American Kenpo practitioners
Australian expatriate actresses in the United States
Australian female taekwondo practitioners
Australian film actresses
Australian people of Italian descent
Living people
People educated at Sydney Girls High School
University of Technology Sydney alumni